Seamonkey may refer to:
 Sea-Monkeys, a certain hybrid of brine shrimps
 SeaMonkey, an internet application suite
 The Amazing Live Sea Monkeys, a television series